Beach Meadows is a settlement in the Region of Queens Municipality, Nova Scotia, Canada. It is the site of Beach Meadows Beach Park.

References

Communities in the Region of Queens Municipality
General Service Areas in Nova Scotia